Husbands is an American web series written and created by Brad Bell and Jane Espenson, which premiered September 13, 2011, via super syndication on streaming platforms such as Blip, YouTube and Roku. The series stars Brad Bell and Sean Hemeon as a newly married couple. Billed as the world's first marriage equality comedy, Husbands is a modern look on the classic premise of the newlywed sitcom.

The second season premiered August 15, 2012. After producing two seasons independently, it was announced that CW Seed had made a six-episode order for a third season of Husbands, which aired on August 15, 2013. No forthcoming seasons have since been announced.

Synopsis
After six weeks of dating, an actor (Bell) and a baseball player (Hemeon) travel to Las Vegas in celebration of a federal amendment for marriage equality, only to wind up drunk-married to each other. Fearing that a public divorce would be devastating to the cause, and their careers, the two decide to stay married.

Production

Conception
The series originated from a script written by Brad Bell, entitled SO L.A., the story of a gay man in his twenties, his female best friend, and the single life in Los Angeles. Jane Espenson read the script and declared it "brilliant, and funny, and hilarious". She urged Bell to move forward with the project and search for a more immediate angle. Bell countered by offering the premise of young same-sex newlyweds, giving the concept a "fresher take" and turning it into a platform for his signature comedic style of societal observations. Bell then wrote the initial draft of what became Husbands overnight.

Development history

Husbands debuted on September 13, 2011. The show was hosted by Streamin’ Garage for its worldwide series premiere.

To fund season two, the creators launched a Kickstarter platform for individual pledges, the primary goal being $50,000. On April 18, 2012, the campaign reached $60,000, 120% of their original goal. In an interview with Heat, Bell added that they were "turning everything up, the quality, the controversy, the comedy, the heart, the sex -- everything". On August 13, 2012, season two premiered at the Paley Center for Media in Beverly Hills, California, making it the first online series to be hosted by Paley Center. The second season consisted of three eight-minute acts.

On March 27, 2013, Variety reported that Husbands would continue production in partnership with CW Seed. Accordingly, CW Seed ordered six episodes for the third season, consisting of two story arcs. It aired on the network on August 15, 2013, and debuted a special screening at the Paley Center for Media on August 14, 2013. However, with the move to CW Seed, the new content on its website was geographically locked to air in the United States. Brad Bell explained, "25% of our audience is international, and we love those fans ... I am working on how we are going to get it to them". The season was released internationally on October 17, 2013.

Jane Espenson confirmed in August 2014 that Husbands would return for a fourth season with a "new schedule".

Cast and characters
On July 12, 2011, the principal cast members were announced to be Brad Bell, Sean Hemeon and Alessandra Torresani. Hemeon was the last actor to audition for the part of Brady, and eventually got the role. The name of his character Brady Kelly is a deliberate word play on the name of show creator Brad Bell. During the live world premiere of season one, Bell announced that the first two guest appearances would be Michael Buckley and Nathan Fillion.

At the 2012 San Diego Comic-Con, Brad Bell and Jane Espenson revealed that Joss Whedon would appear in all episodes of the second season as Wes, on which Whedon commented that it was his "biggest acting role yet". Further casting for season two included Jon Cryer, Mekhi Phifer, Felicia Day, Amber Benson, Emma Caulfield, Tricia Helfer, Sasha Roiz, Magda Apanowicz, Aasha Davis, Dichen Lachman, and Clare Grant.

On July 5, 2013, The Hollywood Reporter announced Amy Acker as the first guest star of the third season. During the 2013 San Diego Comic-Con, the casting sheet for season three was revealed to include Seth Green, Michael Hogan, Beth Grant and Deb Theaker. A trailer later confirmed that Hogan and Grant would be playing Brady's parents Scott and Gillian, respectively. Shortly after, Janina Gavankar and Elaine Carroll were added to the list.

Themes

In an article for The Huffington Post, creator Brad Bell said that a concept he had in mind while creating Husbands was to retain a framing device of conventional sitcom tropes, but "instead of avoiding the cliché, we can somehow reinvent the wheel". He elaborated on the show's philosophy:

In a piece, while examining the show in comparison to Mad About You, Den of Geeks Laura Akers reasons that "this comparison sells the online comedy short". Akers added that the "[Mad About You characters] never had to face the kind of scrutiny that Brady and Cheeks do nor did the validity of heterosexual marriage as a construct rest on their shoulders". Akers concluded that "for all its courage in taking on some of these issues, it’s never heavy-handed or melodramatic. Instead, it’s whimsical, witty, and highly entertaining ... And because we recognize, gay or straight, what love really looks like, the show’s appeal is universal".

Bell proceeded to say that Husbands "lives in the newest medium for entertainment because, along with proving that American audiences are more progressive than broadcast networks might think, the show also demonstrates that viewers are happy to consume entertainment in a new medium, which is actually an old medium reinvented, which is actually the entire conceptual frame of Husbands as a sitcom". Themes of 'gender identity versus sexual identity' served as subtext for the second season, and according to Bell, "recur throughout the entire series".

Episodes

Season 1 (2011)

Season 2 (2012)

Season 3 (2013)

In other media

Comic books

At the 2012 Dragon Con, it was announced that an exclusive six-issue Husbands digital comic book series would be released, starting October 24, 2012, with Dark Horse Comics, featuring art by Ron Chan and various other artists. Jane Espenson elaborated on the key concept, saying that "the comic books are going to totally dive into a whole [alternate-universe] premise. So we're going from genre-curious to full-on genre". The storyline follows the events that take place after Cheeks and Brady receive a mysterious wedding present, which sets in motion a chain of events, thematic to the rabbit hole metaphor. Brad Bell, who wrote the script with Espenson, says "I wanted to make sure we translated Husbands into something worthy of the comic realm. It’s not some sort of trans-media marketing ploy. I think fans of comics and fans of Husbands will enjoy it". The series was ultimately collected in a hardcover edition, released March 27, 2013.

Reception

Critical reaction
Husbands was among the first new media series to receive critical acclaim from multiple mainstream media outlets, including high praise from The New Yorker, which marked the publication's first inclusion of a new media series. Commending the series' writing, TVLine remarked that "rapid fire wit and comedic cleverness dominate every moment". Maureen Ryan of The Huffington Post noted the intricacy beneath Husbands sitcom sensibility, saying, "Husbands doesn't side-step the complexity of the situation…it deftly uses those problems as comedic fodder". Lifestyle magazine Out echoed this sentiment by calling Husbands "crackling cultural commentary with the quick-step energy of classic screwball comedy" while Time observed that, though Husbands "starts from a high-satire topic about the public debate over gay marriage" it ultimately "ends up telling a very sweet story about two guys trying to have a relationship simply as people". In addition to being named the Best Web Comedy of 2011 by TV.com and "currently the best web series running" by A.V. Club's Emily VanDerWerff, Husbands was also called "One of the smartest, most unique, and powerful pieces of entertainment this year" by The Insider.

As for the show's role in the entertainment industry, political blog ThinkProgress defined Husbands as "pioneering" and "an important example of how television distributed online fits into a larger pop-culture ecosystem". Adding to that idea, Complex praised the show for being "consistently hilarious…while blazing digital and social trails".

Before guest starring in season two, Joss Whedon expressed his admiration for the series, and described it as "full of the kind of whip-smart remarks you wish you'd written yourself". Additional media coverage has included Wired, The Chicago Tribune, The Philadelphia Inquirer, The Atlantic, The Advocate, The Austin Chronicle, The Salt Lake Tribune, The Los Angeles Times, LA Weekly, Backstage, The Backlot, AfterEllen, as well as the media monitoring organization GLAAD.

Accolades

References

External links
 
 

American comedy web series
2010s American sitcoms
2011 American television series debuts
2013 American television series endings
2011 web series debuts
Same-sex marriage in television
2010s American LGBT-related comedy television series
English-language television shows
Gay-related television shows
Television shows set in Los Angeles
2010s American romantic comedy television series
American LGBT-related web series